Bullata is a genus of small to large sea snails, marine gastropod mollusks in the family Marginellidae, the margin snails.

Distribution
This is a tropical western Atlantic genus.

Habitat
Representatives from this genus have been recorded at depths from one to 60 metres.

Shell description
The shells of species in this genus are moderately large to very large, range size from 14 mm (Bullata largillieri, smallest species of Bullata) to 97.9 mm (largest specimen known of Bullata bullata). (pl I)

The shell color is a yellowish-orange to orange- or pinkish-brown, spirally banded (pl II) or with white spots (pl III).  The lip is pink, yellow, or orange, darker than shell color (pl IV).

The shell surface is smooth and glossy.

The shape is elliptical to oblong or obovate, moderately to strongly shouldered (pl V bottom).  The spire is immersed or near so (pl V top).  The aperture  is narrow to moderately broad, wider anteriorly. The lip is moderately strongly thickened, weakly to strongly denticulate in adults, with a distinct external varix. A siphonal notch is present but a posterior notch is absent. The parietal callusing is weakly to strongly developed, especially posteriorly, and is absent in type species.  The columella has four continuous plications occupying less than half the aperture length. The internal whorls are unmodified. (pl VI/VII)

Remarks
The large, patterned shells with an immersed spire and 4 moderately heavy columellar plications which are not crowded anteriorly, serve to distinguish this group of species. This genus is restricted to the Caribbean province, where it evolved in the Miocene as a direct offshoot of Prunum.

Coan (1965:189) placed Cryptospyra as a subgenus of Bullata. Coovert & Coovert (1995:93) consider as distinct genus, as they have separate origins: Bullata is a direct descendant of Caribbean Prunum, whereas Cryptospira is restricted to the western Indo-Pacific where it evolved.

Species
Species within the genus Bullata include:
 Bullata analuciae de Souza & Coovert, 2001
 Bullata bullata (Born, 1778) - type species
 Bullata guerrinii de Souza & Coovert, 2001
 Bullata largillieri (Kiener, 1834)
 Bullata lilacina (Sowerby II, 1846)
 Bullata mathewsi (van Mol & Tursch, 1967)
 Species brought into synonymy
 Bullata angustata (G.B. Sowerby, 1846): synonym of Volvarina angustata (G.B. Sowerby II, 1846)
 Bullata bernardi (Largilliert, 1845): synonym of Cryptospira strigata (Dillwyn, 1817)
 Bullata dactylus (Lamarck, 1822): synonym of Cryptospira dactylus (Lamarck, 1822)
 Bullata glauca (Jousseaume, 1875): synonym of Cryptospira glauca Jousseaume, 1875
 Bullata hindsiana (Petit de la Saussaye, 1851): synonym of Prunum olivaeforme (Kiener, 1834)
 Bullata lipei Clover, 1990: synonym of Prunum lipei (Clover, 1990)
 Bullata mabellae Melvill & Standen, 1901: synonym of Prunum mabellae (Melvill & Standen, 1901)
 Bullata princeps G. B. Sowerby III, 1901: synonym of Closia princeps (G.B. Sowerby III, 1901)
 Bullata quadrilineata (Gaskoin, 1849): synonym of Cryptospira quadrilineata (Gaskoin, 1849)
 Bullata sarda (Kiener, 1834): synonym of Closia sarda (Kiener, 1834)
 Bullata scripta (Hinds, 1844): synonym of Cryptospira scripta (Hinds, 1844)
 Bullata strigata (Dillwyn, 1817): synonym of Cryptospira strigata (Dillwyn, 1817)
 Bullata tricincta (Hinds, 1844): synonym of Cryptospira tricincta (Hinds, 1844)
 Bullata ventricosa (Fischer von Waldheim, 1807): synonym of Cryptospira ventricosa (Fischer von Waldheim, 1807)

References

Further reading 
 Coan E. (1965). "A proposed reclassification of the Family Marginellidae". The Veliger 7(3): 184-194.
 Coovert G. & Coovert H. (1995). "Revision of the Supraspecific Classification of Marginelliform Gastropods". The Nautilus 109(2-3): 43-110.
 Souza P. J. S. & Coovert G. A. (2001). "Revision of the Recent species of Bullata Jousseaume, 1875 (Gastropoda: Marginellidae) with the description of two new species". The Nautilus 115(1): 1-14. (latest generic review)

External links

Marginellidae
Gastropod genera